Rachael Lauren Hip-Flores is an American actress. Born and raised in Piscataway, New Jersey, she is known for her role in the web series Anyone But Me, for which she received the IAWTV, Streamy, and Indie Series Awards for Best Lead Actress in a Drama Series. She also played a lead role in the web series Producing Juliet for which she received nominations for Best Ensemble Cast and starred in a series called Good people in love, for this she was nominated for Best Lead Actress in a Drama. She also appeared as a leading actress in the two webseries, Shadow Free and Lucercia  

You can also see her in the YouTube Videos of Buzzfeed Motion, Alice + Hal and For All Women Who Are Born Leaders.

See also
 List of Streamy Award winners
 2nd Streamy Awards (2010)

References

External links
 

Living people
American stage actresses
21st-century American actresses
Rutgers University alumni
People from Piscataway, New Jersey
Actresses from New Jersey
Streamy Award winners
Year of birth missing (living people)